See Deori (disambiguation) for disambiguation

Deori is a census town in Bilaspur district  in the state of Chhattisgarh, India.

Geography
It has an average elevation of 247 metres (810 feet).

Demographics
 India census, Deori had a population of 11,636. Males constitute 52% of the population and females 48%. Deori has an average literacy rate of 62%, higher than the national average of 59.5%: male literacy is 72% and, female literacy is 52%. In Deori, 16% of the population is under 6 years of age.

References

Cities and towns in Bilaspur district, Chhattisgarh